In mathematics, to approximate a derivative to an arbitrary order of accuracy, it is possible to use the finite difference.  A finite difference can be central,  forward or backward.

Central finite difference

This table contains the coefficients of the central differences, for several orders of accuracy and with uniform grid spacing:
 

For example, the third derivative with a second-order accuracy is

 

For the -th derivative with accuracy , there are  central coefficients . These are given by the solution of the linear equation system

 

where the only non-zero value on the right hand side is in the -th row.

An open source implementation for calculating finite difference coefficients of arbitrary derivates and accuracy order in one dimension is available.

Forward finite difference

This table contains the coefficients of the forward differences, for several orders of accuracy and with uniform grid spacing:

For example, the first derivative with a third-order accuracy and the second derivative with a second-order accuracy are

 

 

while the corresponding backward approximations are given by

Backward finite difference

To get the coefficients of the backward approximations from those of the forward ones, give all odd derivatives listed in the table in the previous section the opposite sign, whereas for even derivatives the signs stay the same.
The following table illustrates this:

Arbitrary stencil points

For a given arbitrary stencil points   of length  with the order of derivatives , the finite difference coefficients can be obtained by solving the linear equations 

 

where  is the Kronecker delta, equal to one if , and zero otherwise.

 

The order of accuracy of the approximation takes the usual form .

See also
 Finite difference method
 Finite difference
 Five-point stencil
 Numerical differentiation

References 

Finite differences
Numerical differential equations